Dar al-Islam or Darul Islam (literally '')
 Dar al-islam, an Islamic term for the Muslim regions of the world
 Dar es Salaam, the largest city in Tanzania
 Dar al-Islam (organization), a small non-profit organization based in New Mexico, United States 
 Dar al-Islam (magazine), a French-language magazine self-published by the Islamic terrorist organization ISIL/ISIS/IS/Daesh
 Darul Islam (Indonesia), an Islamist group responsible for an insurgency against the Indonesian government during the 1950s and 1960s
 Darul Islam (Nigeria), an Islamic organization based in Nigeria
 Darul Islam (United States), a Black Muslim religious group based in the United States
 Darul Islam (political movement), a political movement led by Niaz Ali Khan around 1940 to separate Pakistan as a Muslim state from India

Mosques 
 Daar-Ul-Islam, Saint Louis, a mosque located in Missouri, United States